Big Blues may refer to:

 Big Blues (Jimmy Witherspoon album), 1981
 Big Blues (Art Farmer album), 1978